Moisuc is a Romanian surname. People with the surname include:

 Alexandru Moisuc (born 1942), Romanian agroscientist
 Viorica Moisuc (born 1934), Romanian MEP

Romanian-language surnames